Zamboanga del Sur's at-large congressional district is an obsolete congressional district that encompassed the area of Zamboanga del Sur in the Philippines. It was represented in the House of Representatives from 1953 to 1972 and in the Regular Batasang Pambansa from 1984 to 1986. The province of Zamboanga del Sur was created as a result of the partition of Zamboanga in 1952 and elected its first representative provincewide at-large during the 1953 Philippine House of Representatives elections. Roseller T. Lim who served as representative of Zamboanga's at-large congressional district during the partition was this district's first representative. The district remained a single-member district until the dissolution of the lower house in 1972. It was later absorbed by the multi-member Region IX's at-large district for the national parliament in 1978. In 1984, provincial and city representations were restored and Zamboanga del Sur elected three members for the regular parliament with a separate representation created for Zamboanga City. The district was abolished following the 1987 reapportionment to establish three districts under a new constitution.

Representation history

See also
Legislative districts of Zamboanga del Norte

References

Former congressional districts of the Philippines
Politics of Zamboanga del Sur
1952 establishments in the Philippines
1972 disestablishments in the Philippines
1984 establishments in the Philippines
1986 disestablishments in the Philippines
At-large congressional districts of the Philippines
Congressional districts of Zamboanga Peninsula
Constituencies established in 1952
Constituencies disestablished in 1972
Constituencies established in 1984
Constituencies disestablished in 1986